On 30 December 2020, the Garda Armed Support Unit shot 27-year-old George Nkencho in Clonee on the Dublin–Meath border, after graduated attempts to detain him failed. He had assaulted a shop staff member and threatened others with a knife.

Timeline
Prior to the standoff with armed , Nkencho was involved in an altercation in a Eurospar supermarket in Hartstown, where he allegedly assaulted a manager who received a broken nose which required him being taken to Connolly Hospital. He was followed by twelve unarmed , later backed up by members of the Armed Support Unit, who instructed him to drop the knife and then used tasers and pepper spray in attempts to disarm him. At 12:35pm, a member of the Armed Support Unit fired six shots at Nkencho outside his family home.

Aftermath

The morning after the fatal shooting, on 31 December 2020 (New Year's Eve), around 200 people gathered outside Blanchardstown Garda Station in a protest over the death of Nkencho, calling for those involved to be punished. Garda sources stressed to the media that these incidents had nothing to do with the Nkencho family or friends, and that they suspected a gang which has staged fights in Dublin city centre to be responsible for hijacking part of the demonstration. Large crowds of protestors marched through Blanchardstown shopping centre on a busy New Year's Eve, when all non-essential businesses were to close at the end of the day, following the reimposition of full COVID-19 Level 5 lockdown restrictions.

Minister for Justice Helen McEntee and  Leo Varadkar expressed their sympathies with the family of Nkencho on Twitter. McEntee described the fatal shooting as "an extremely upsetting loss and a tragedy for his family" while the  urged the public not to engage in "speculation". Minister for Children, Equality, Disability, Integration and Youth Roderic O'Gorman also took to Twitter tweeting that he was "deeply saddened" upon hearing the news.

Following Nkencho's death, false allegations circulated online, claiming that Nkencho had 30 prior criminal convictions. On 3 January, the  released a statement stating its concern at what it called "lies being circulated widely online by fascists and racists" and confirming that Nkencho had no criminal convictions at all.

Protests continued throughout the week. For a fifth day in a row on 4 January, crowds of up to 50 people gathered outside Blanchardstown Garda station and Dublin's Spire in O'Connell Street to protest over the shooting of Nkencho.

Garda sources informed the media that they feared a "stabbing or hostage situation" when Nkencho was outside his family home, and could not have known at that time whose home he was outside or his relationship to the occupants. The deceased's three siblings were in the hallway when the shots were fired.

Six months later, on 21 June 2021, an inquest into the death of Nkencho was opened in the Dublin coroner's court, before being adjourned for six months until December 2021, as the GSOC investigation remained ongoing. A group of demonstrators gathered outside the RDS in support of the family members who attended the inquest opening. By December 2021, it was reported that a further adjournment was sought at the coroner's court, as the GSOC investigation was "not yet complete".

See also
 Death of John Carthy
 Shooting of Colm Horkan

References

2020 in the Republic of Ireland
Killings by Garda Síochána members
Deaths by person in the Republic of Ireland
Filmed killings by law enforcement